

History

1937-1967: East Howe Senior School
The school was built in 1937 as East Howe Senior School for boys and girls. The original East Howe School was built in 1912 by Dorset County Council when the area was rural. The school was brought under the control of Bournemouth Local Education Authority in 1931 when Bournemouth extended its boundaries to include the area. The school grew rapidly and the seniors moved to their new building along Hadow Road (supposedly named after Henry Hadow of the Hadow Report of 1926). During World War II, the school was utilized as a hospital. The original 1912 school is now used as a youth centre.

1967-1999: Kingsleigh Secondary School
In 1967 the boys and girls schools merged to become Kingsleigh Secondary School. The local infant school and junior school were also renamed Kingsleigh. A number of buildings were added to the school until it was put in special measures.

2000-2009: Kings High School
In 2000 the school was renamed Kings High School. The school was led by Mr Gareth Jones who, within five years, turned Kings High into Bournemouth's most improved school - with 60% of its pupils achieving five A* to C's, compared with 24% in 2001. Kings High School was led by Alyn Fendley up until 2010, the year the school was renovated and renamed 'The Bourne Academy'.

2010-Present: The Bourne Academy, Sixth Form and BSF
On 1 September 2010, Kings High became The Bourne Academy, which still operates out of the old Kings High site, which was renovated. The school is also sponsored by Canford School.

The Academy is underwent a government funded revival of schools all around the country. This was called BSF (Building Schools for the Future). The nominated BSF Team from Kings High attended conferences in Bournemouth and London along with other schools around Bournemouth. The main east and west wing building is pre World War II, but was refurbished in Quarter 2 and 3 of 2012. The Academy has built a new science block, design and technology block and a new canteen and dance studio called "The Hub", the newly refurbished main building and Sports Hall and extension of the Science block. The Academy then underwent a 10 million pound building work project completed in August 2013, The Academy now also has a new Maths and English block, additional food room, sixth form building, library and reception. The Academy opened a Sixth form in September 2013.

References

External links
The Bourne Academy official website

Schools in Bournemouth
Secondary schools in Bournemouth, Christchurch and Poole
Academies in Bournemouth, Christchurch and Poole